Mao Naga may refer to:
 Mao Naga people (Mao Nagas, Sopvoma Naga people, Sopvoma Nagas, Sopvoma people) - Mao people
 Mao Naga language (Mao language, Sopvoma Naga language) - Sopvoma language